Tony Taylor may refer to:

Sports
 Tony Taylor (baseball) (1935–2020), Cuban second baseman
 Tony Taylor (footballer, born 1946), Scottish footballer
 Tony Taylor (American football) (born 1984), American linebacker
 Tony Taylor (footballer, born 1989), Panamanian footballer
 Tony Taylor (basketball) (born 1990), American basketball player

Other people
 Tony Taylor (GC) (1917–1972), Australian recipient of the George Cross
 Tony Taylor (Irish republican) (fl. 2010s), community activist and former Provisional IRA inmate
 Tony Taylor, music producer of No Boundaries
 Tony Taylor, dog fighter convicted in the Bad Newz Kennels dog fighting investigation case

See also
 Toni Tauler (born 1974), racing cyclist
 Anthony Taylor (disambiguation)